Cazères, or sometimes locally called as Cazères-sur-Garonne, is a small town and commune in the Haute-Garonne department in southwestern France. Cazères station has rail connections to Toulouse, Pau and Tarbes. It is the seat (capital) of the canton of Cazères.

The 2010 Census recorded the town having a population of 4,667 distributed between 1,290 households, decreasing to a population of 4,799 in 1,357 households in the 2019 Census.

Geography
The town lies on the banks of the Garonne river, which is forming a border with Gensac-sur-Garonne, Saint-Christaud, and Couladère.

The commune is bordered by nine other communes: Lavelanet-de-Comminges to the north, Le Fousseret to the northwest, Saint-Julien-sur-Garonne to the northeast, Gensac-sur-Garonne to the east, Saint-Christaud across the river Garonne to the southeast, Couladère across the river Garonne to the south, Palaminy and Saint-Michel to the southwest, and finally by Mondavezan to the east.

Population
The inhabitants of Cazères are known as Cazérien(ne)s in French.

Twin towns
Cazères is twinned with:
 Collbató, Spain (since 10 October, 1986)

See also
Communes of the Haute-Garonne department

References

External links

Official site

Communes of Haute-Garonne